Peter Hullett Desbarats, OC (July 2, 1933 – February 11, 2014) was a Canadian author, playwright and journalist. He was also the dean of journalism at the University of Western Ontario (1981–1997), a former commissioner in the Somalia Inquiry and a former Maclean-Hunter chair of Communications Ethics at Ryerson University in Toronto, Ontario.

Until his death from Alzheimer's disease, he lived in a heritage home with his actress wife Hazel in the East Woodfield Heritage Conservation District in London, Ontario.

Early life
Peter Desbarats was born in 1933 to Hullett Desbarats (a descendant of the printer and publisher George-Édouard Desbarats) and Margaret Rettie.  The family lived on Connaught Avenue in the Notre-Dame-de-Grâce neighbourhood of Montreal, where Peter attended Loyola High School.

Career

Before he was appointed dean of UWO's journalism school, which he successfully fought to save in the 1990s when UWO wanted to discontinue the program, he worked as a print and television journalist for 30 years, starting as a copy boy with the Canadian Press, Canada's national news co-operative, in his home town of Montreal.

Desbarats worked in London's Fleet Street for Reuters news agency, as a political reporter and foreign correspondent for the Montreal Star and as national affairs columnist for the Toronto Star. In the 1960s and early 1970s he hosted the supper-hour news and current affairs show on Montreal television station CBMT, and in the 1970s was co-anchor and Ottawa Bureau Chief for the Global Television Network, winning the 1977 ACTRA Award for best news broadcaster.

Desbarats wrote 13 books, including René: A Canadian in Search of Country, a best-selling biography of René Lévesque; Somalia Cover-Up: A Commissioner's Journal, a book about his stint on the Somalia Inquiry;, and Guide to Canadian News Media, a standard journalism text; as well as several children's books and a 2002 stage play, Her Worship, about controversial London mayor Dianne Haskett. With the cartoonist Aislin, he co-wrote one of the first books of comics history in Canada, The Hecklers: A History of Canadian Political Cartooning and a Cartoonists' History of Canada. He was later a contributor to The Globe and Mail, the Ottawa Citizen and The London Free Press, as well as an active community volunteer in London.

In 2006, he was made an Officer of the Order of Canada.

References

External links

1933 births
2014 deaths
21st-century Canadian dramatists and playwrights
Canadian children's writers
Canadian columnists
Canadian television news anchors
French Quebecers
Journalists from Montreal
Officers of the Order of Canada
University of Western Ontario alumni
Writers from London, Ontario
Writers from Montreal
Global Television Network people
Neurological disease deaths in Ontario
Deaths from Alzheimer's disease
Academic staff of the University of Western Ontario
Academic staff of Toronto Metropolitan University
Canadian male dramatists and playwrights
Canadian male non-fiction writers
Comics critics
20th-century Canadian journalists
21st-century Canadian journalists
20th-century Canadian male writers
21st-century Canadian male writers